A Cielo Abierto is a collection of 91 articles by Ángel Romero Díaz, published between 2009 and 2011. The initial articles were published in the newspapers Odiel and El Periódico de Huelva, and later assembled into a book, published on April 23, 2014 by the editorial, Editorial Niebla.

Currently, profits from book sales go towards Medecins Sans Frontieres.

References

External links
 Letter Against the Ebola
 Press
 Presentation.

2014 non-fiction books
Spanish non-fiction books
Essay collections